Sadeka Halim is a professor of University of Dhaka and the first female dean of the Faculty of Social Sciences of the University. She is the first woman to be the Chief Information Commissioner of Bangladesh.

Early life and education
Halim's father, Fazlul Halim Chowdhury, was a vice-chancellor of the University of Dhaka.  She passed SSC exam from Udyon High School and HSC exam from Holycross School and College. She graduated from the University of Dhaka.

Career

In 1988, Halim was appointed as a teacher in the Department of Social Sciences of University of Dhaka. Later she received a second postgraduate and PhD degree from McGill University of Canada with Commonwealth Scholarship. She then completed the post-doctorate of the Commonwealth Staff Fellowship from the University of Bath of the United Kingdom. From July 2009 to June 2014, she served as the first woman information commissioner. Besides, she served as a syndicate member of the University of Dhaka from 2004 to 2009, and she was a member of the executive council of the Teachers' Association and three times a member of the Senate. She was a member of the National Education Policy Committee-18 of 2009 special educationists committee. About 50 research articles have been published in national and international journals. Issues related to gender equality, forest and land, development, indigenous issues, rights of human rights and information.

In September 2022, the government broke the trustee board of Manarat International University and created a new board which included Halim. On 2022 Council of Awami League, she was made AL Advisory Council members.

Controversy 
Different public universities teacher have raised allegations of plagiarism in a research paper produced by Halim. Later, she issued legal notice against a Dhaka University (DU) reporter along with four others for publishing news of allegedly plagiarism in her research paper.

Published books
 Chetonayonei Unnayun : Bangladeshi Nijera Kori'r Obhiggota
 Development as Conscientization : The Case of Nijera Kori in Bangladesh
 Life and Land of Adibashis : Land Dispossession and Alienation of Adibshis in the plain Districts of Bangladesh

References

Living people
University of Dhaka alumni
Academic staff of the University of Dhaka
Year of birth missing (living people)
Place of birth missing (living people)